The 3rd Annual Streamy Awards was the third installment of the Streamy Awards honoring streaming television series. The awards were held on February 17, 2013, at the Hollywood Palladium in Los Angeles, California. It was hosted by the founder of Nerdist Industries, Chris Hardwick. Presented three years after the unsuccessful 2nd Streamy Awards which led to the International Academy of Web Television leaving the show, Tubefilter partnered with Dick Clark Productions in an attempt to bolster the credibility of the awards and with hopes of broadcasting the show on television. The show was viewed as more professional than previous years and was praised for its musical performances, but it also received a more mixed reception on its increased focus on mainstream shows and celebrities.

Background 
Although billed as the "3rd Annual", the poorly received 2nd Streamy Awards were actually presented three years prior in March 2010. They were criticized for technical problems, interruptions and controversy, leading to the two-year hiatus as the producers and organizers took time to regroup. In response to the controversy surrounding the 2nd Annual Streamys, the International Academy of Web Television, a partner in the 2010 event, chose to separate from the Streamys and create its own awards ceremony, the IAWTV Awards, for 2011. Tubefilter, the original co-creators of the Streamy Awards, partnered in 2011 with Dick Clark Productions, producers of the American Music Awards and other established entertainment industry awards shows, in an apparent effort to broaden the mainstream appeal and boost the credibility of the Streamy Awards. They also hoped to broadcast the show on television but were unable to for the 2013 Streamys.

Performers 
Tubefilter and Dick Clark Productions wanted collaborations between established stars and popular music YouTubers for the awards, arranging for YouTube stars to feature in the songs of the performers. The ceremony featured the musical performances of the following artists:

Winners and nominees

The nominees were announced on December 17, 2012, and the finalists for the Audience Choice Award categories were announced on February 5, 2013. 19 of the 35 award winners were announced prior to the presentation on February 14, 2013. The remaining categories were announced during the main ceremony at the Hollywood Palladium on February 17. Winners of the categories were selected by the Streamys Blue Ribbon Panel except for the Audience Choice awards which were put to a public vote.

Winners are listed first, in bold.

Web series with multiple nominations and awards

Reception 
Stephanie Carrie, writing for LA Weekly, felt that the award show was more professional than previous years and noted the diversity of figures in attendance, citing as an example the presenters of the first award, Larry King and Jenna Marbles. Internet personality Felicia Day was more critical of the more mainstream approach compared to previous years stating "My impression is it's almost like a red carpet for old media. Four years ago the show was about independent spirit, innovation, and people doing things to break the system. Now it's about Hollywood coming in." Likewise, Ed Carrasco of NewMediaRockstars felt that the event should have been more focused around small independent creators than large scale productions such as Halo 4: Forward Unto Dawn and Tom Hanks’ Electric City which won many of the show's awards. Overall, he opined "If these ceremonies are all about creators, let’s make them about creators, not about what has the most cred or money thrown into it."

Carrie described the musical performance of Shontelle and featured artists Lisa Lavie, Savannah Outen, Kurt Hugo Schneider, and Sam Tsui as a highlight of the night and said that it "illustrated beautifully how the web allows content creators and consumer to interact in a way that's still rare in mainstream media." Carrasco viewed the performance by Vanilla Ice positively, and also felt that the speeches of some of the award winners seemed more genuine compared to more mainstream award shows.

See also 
List of Streamy Award winners

References

External links
Streamy Awards website

Streamy Awards
Streamy Awards
2013 in American television
Streamy
2013 in Internet culture